"All Due Respect" is the second episode of the third season of the HBO original series The Wire. The episode was written by Richard Price from a story by David Simon & Richard Price and was directed by Steve Shill. It originally aired on September 26, 2004.

Plot
McNulty visits medical examiner Randall Frazier, skeptical that D'Angelo Barksdale's death in prison was a suicide. Frazier reports that D'Angelo's death could have been a homicide, citing bruises on his neck and back. McNulty visits D'Angelo's ex-girlfriend Donette, who doesn't tell him anything. Meanwhile, Cheese executes his dog when it loses in a dogfight. Soon afterwards, Tree, a drug dealer attending the dogfight, approaches and kills another dealer named Jelly. The MCU hears chatter about the murder over the wire, assuming a gang war has erupted.

Daniels and the Major Case Unit want to make arrests for the murders, but McNulty argues that they should gather more evidence in the hope of ultimately bringing down Bell. The unit arrests Cheese's crew. Under questioning, Cheese admits to killing his dog  not a person as the detectives assumed  meaning he can't be charged. The following day, the MCU finds that their wiretaps have gone dead. While patrolling the Western, Herc and Carver pick up Poot.

Herc, Carver and Kenneth Dozerman go to the movies with their girlfriends, where they are mortified to bump into Poot, Bodie, and Puddin with their dates. Later, Dozerman is shot and wounded while undercover, and his gun is stolen. The next day, Colvin tells his men that he is suspending all undercover narcotics work, likening the War on Drugs to Prohibition. Back out on the street, Herc cannot understand Colvin's reasoning. Omar and his crew stick up Shamrock and Country while they collect money for a drug resupply.

Bell visits Avon in prison and reveals his plan to supply other dealers. Avon asks Bell to target specific high turnover areas, but Bell expresses reluctance to use violence to maintain their street cred. Country, Shamrock and Bodie are sent to talk to mid-level dealers to try to displace their suppliers. Bodie is tasked with approaching Marlo, but is unable to find him; Marlo instructs his corner boss Fruit to ignore Bodie and go back to work. At the funeral home, Bell sends Bodie out to look for Marlo again and learns of Omar's robbery. Marlo meets with Vinson, who advises him to prepare for war if he doesn't compromise with the Barksdales.

Production

Title Reference
The phrase "all due respect" is not used by many different characters in this episode, but the context in which it would be used is what is notable. Characters who would say it are involved in different institutions followed in The Wire, but the phrase (as expected) would precede a criticism for how those institutions are run. For example, in the previous episode, Bunny Colvin could have used it in his criticism of Rawls' encouragement of employing stat-juking tactics, even with homicides, asking him "how do you make a body disappear?". Similarly, in the scene where the Major Case Unit members are having lunch, McNulty could have used it when he was arguing to Daniels that they should keep going after Stringer Bell while everyone else (Daniels, Pearlman, Freamon, and Greggs) is in agreement that they should give up the wiretap and make arrests to close the homicide cases in the hope that someone will give up someone else a level above them in the drug organizations. The fact that the homicide case they try to lay on Cheese (through the use of the wiretap) does not work is a kind of validation of McNulty's argument, in spite of the fact that he has become obsessed with proving himself against Stringer Bell (in the previous episode he said "We're gonna let that same son of a bitch beat me again?", referencing Stringer).

Interestingly, the first time we actually hear the phrase used (in the opening scene), it is directed at Omar Little and is said by a drug dealer he is in the process of robbing. It could not be imagined that Omar Little would be the one using the phrase in an institutional context because, as a gun-toting rogue, he does not subscribe to any kind of institution and acts as a free agent, but the reason this moment is included could be construed as a subtle indication that Omar's relationship with drug dealers in Baltimore has effectively created its own institution: they get drugs and drug money, and he robs them of it all. To circle back to McNulty's argument with Daniels and the MCU, this idea of new institutions being created can also apply; the end of season two saw the creation of the unit and now there is already an established status quo with McNulty still being the rebel within a unit that was effectively designed to be a departure from the normal, completely dysfunctional police units. This is also established in the previous episode when McNulty protests Daniels' and Pearlman's decision to close the wiretap and Freamon admonishes him, saying "It's you against the world, is it?" and is further elaborated on in the later episode "Hamsterdam" when Freamon and McNulty argue about chain of command and who the unit should be targeting.

Beyond these above listings where "all due respect" is never said, another intriguing moment happens when we would expect that it would be fitting for a character to say the phrase but their subsequent behavior subverts this expectation. When Stringer Bell calls a meeting that Bodie and others attend, Stringer chastises Bodie for temporarily abandoning his search for Marlo Stanfield to attend the meeting. Bodie is rendered upset at Bell's disappointment but, after a moment, notably does not protest; he simply walks away to resume his search, following Stringer's order. In the larger context of Bodie's character arc, his compliance is important in showing him to still be firmly embedded and comfortable with being in the drug trade (as shown later in this season during a house party that Cutty also attends). However, his being upset with Stringer is an indication that, while he may not have acquired it quite yet, he will eventually cultivate the same rebellious spirit shared by D'Angelo Barksdale, who was often at odds with Stringer. The fact that D'Angelo tragically wound up dead (at Stringer's behest, no less) further indicates that Bodie will likely share a similar fate if he stays in the drug trade.

Epigraph

Colvin makes the comment "There's never been a paper bag for drugs" near the end of the episode to his precinct officers, leaving Herc utterly dumbfounded and Carver deeply contemplative.

The statement refers to the practice of using paper bags to hide alcoholic beverages from any observing law enforcement. Colvin explains that when the consumption of alcoholic beverages in public places became illegal, a dilemma was created; public places such as street corners were, as Colvin puts it, "the poor man's lounge" i.e. a gathering place where lower-income or impoverished individuals could find a sense of community or solidarity, and if police were to roll by, they would be obligated to arrest anyone drinking on the corner or risk losing any appearance of authority they had left. The compromise was to hide the alcohol in a paper bag (which Colvin calls a moment of genius), allowing the poor to drink where they wanted to drink at only the additional cost of a cheap paper bag while simultaneously allowing the police to look the other way while saving face.

Colvin also points out that if the police had continued to arrest every poor person on the corner who was drinking, there would be no time or resources available to do actual police work; the irony (which he understands all too well) is that police work is currently not being done as a result of the War on Drugs. This irony is alluded to in season two, which focuses on a smuggling ring only tangentially involving drugs, where Herc genuinely asks if there is any kind of crime in Baltimore not involving drugs. Herc's being confused by Colvin's speech points to the fact that Herc cannot truly identify as a police officer, but is instead a soldier fighting the War on Drugs. Carver's quiet reflection at the end of this episode, however, is the start of his major transition away from the soldier mindset he, up to this point, has shared with Herc. Going forward from this point on, Carver becomes a more and more compassionate person and better police officer, helping Colvin throughout this season and going out of his way to try and do right by Randy Wagstaff.

The subtext in Colvin's speech reads that prohibitive rules with regard to commodities such as alcohol and drugs are completely ineffective and only serve to empower and enrich criminals by creating a market for these now-illicit substances (Boardwalk Empire also understood this) and do harm to those who would use those substances (by way of mass incarceration, widespread poverty, and a whole myriad of other problems explored in The Wire). Colvin's comment alludes to the fact that the utterly uncompromising drug enforcement laws of America (as well as some other nations, such as Sweden) are the source of many of these issues, and his (decidedly hare-brained) scheme to legalize the drug market in his district as seen in later episodes is an attempt at a compromise that is undercut by it not being sanctioned and his needing to keep it secret. It is clear that Colvin understands that drugs, like alcohol, ruin lives and that they should be avoided and definitely not sold, but his commitment to seeing the drug problem not as a war to be fought with brutality but as a public health crisis to be addressed with compassion and mercy is a stance founded not on misguided and poorly-considered laws, but on morality and humanity.

It is this humanity within Colvin that forms the crux of his character and will continue to inform his actions into the next season. The previous episode ended with Colvin coming face to face with the drug problem of Baltimore and realizing he is so ineffective as a police officer that dealers on the corner allow a younger dealer who cannot tell Colvin is police to offer to sell Colvin drugs. Following up on this realization, "All Due Respect" has a moment where he is speaking about his inability to make a difference in the world around him to The Deacon (played by real-life reformed drug kingpin Melvin Williams), who comments on the futility of fighting a war on the drug trade: "That's a force of nature, that's sweeping leaves on a windy day, whoever the hell you are". Colvin's "paper bag" speech shows the audience that he has taken these words to heart, and while this will spell doom for his career and legacy within the Baltimore Police Department, it will embolden him to continue trying to pick up where institutions and established systems fail. Hence, season four has him try to make a difference within the extremely poorly-thought out school and education system.

References

External links
 "All Due Respect" at HBO.com
 

The Wire (season 3) episodes
2004 American television episodes